Casla is a municipality located in the province of Segovia, Castile and León, Spain.

References

Municipalities in the Province of Segovia
Populated places in the Province of Segovia